Verena Metze-Mangold (born 7 October 1946) is a German political scientist,. journalist, and the former president of the German Commission for UNESCO.

Early life 
Verena Metze-Mangold was born in Kassel on 7 October 1946. 
Verena Metze-Mangold holds a PhD in political science, sociology and history.

Career 
Metze-Mangold is an expert in intercultural communication who specialises in the freedom of the press and information, media and network policy, international law and WTO.

Metze-Mangold headed the Protestant Media Academy (cpa) at the Gemeinschaftswerk der Evangelischen Publizistik (GEP) in Frankfurt from 1976 to 1987.

From 1987 to 2011, Metze-Mangold working in the directorate of Hessischer Rundfunk, where she was head of press and public relations until 1993

From 1997 to 2014, Metze-Mangold was the vice president of the German Commission for UNESCO, which she had been a member of since 1982. Between 2014 and 2018, Metze-Mangold was the president of the German Commission for UNESCO.

On 19 October 2019, Metze-Mangold was awarded the Order of Merit of the Federal Republic of Germany for her voluntary work. In 2019, Metze-Mangold joined the advisory board of Candid Foundation

References 

German political scientists
German women journalists
UNESCO officials
1946 births
Living people
Women political scientists
Recipients of the Cross of the Order of Merit of the Federal Republic of Germany